Dear Megha is a 2021 Indian Telugu-language romantic drama film directed by Sushanth Reddy. Produced by Arjun Dasyan under Vedaansh Creative Works, the film stars Megha Akash, Adith Arun and Arjun Somayajula. A remake of 2020 Kannada film Dia, the plot follows the triangular love story. The film was released on 3 September 2021.

Plot
Megha takes three years to confess her feelings to Arjun but he dies in a terrible accident. Later, when she begins a new life with Aadi, she finds out that Arjun is still alive.

Cast 

 Megha Akash as Megha Swaroop "Soup"
 Adith Arun as Aadi
 Arjun Somayajula as Arjun
 Pavitra Lokesh as Aadi's mother 
Ananda Chakrapani as Megha's father

Production 
The film was launched and muhurat shot was done on 10 December 2020.The film was shot at various locations including Gateway of India in Mumbai, Pernem railway station in Pernem (Goa). Filming was done for four days, at Pernem railway station. The entire filming was done in 28 days and was wrapped up in February 2021. Pavitra Lokesh reprised her role from the original version.

Soundtrack 
The first single "Aamani Unte" was released on 16 July 2021. Prakash Pecheti of Telangana Today wrote that "Sid Sriram’s voice and music director Gowra Hari’s rendition would probably be the best work that a film like ‘Dear Megha’ could get." Another reviewer credited it as "one of the best romantic albums in a long time".

Release 
In August 2021, The Hans India reported that the film will be released directly on the over-the-top media service. Later, it was announced that the film would release in theatres on 3 September 2021.

Reception 
Thadhagath Pathi of The Times of India gave a rating of 3 out of 5 and felt that the film is a faithful remake of its original. He added "Dear Megha is a well-shot film that’ll leave you disturbed – just what the makers intended. But how fair is it really to not delve further into Megha’s life is a question the audience can answer." In contrast, Murali Krishna CH felt that film is not so efficient remake of Dia. He praised Megha's acting performance and film score. The Hindu's Y Sunita Chowdhary commented that the film was neither great nor bad.

References

External links 
 

2020s Telugu-language films
2021 films
2021 romantic drama films
Films set in Andhra Pradesh
Films set in Mumbai
Films shot in Andhra Pradesh
Films shot in Mumbai
Indian romantic drama films
Telugu remakes of Kannada films